Sardasht Rural District may refer to:
 Sardasht Rural District (Lordegan County), Chaharmahal and Bakhtiari province
 Sardasht Rural District (Hormozgan Province)
 Sardasht Rural District (Behbahan County), Khuzestan province
 Sardasht Rural District (Dezful County), Khuzestan province